is a Japanese manga series written and illustrated by Keitaro Takahashi. It was serialized in Shogakukan's seinen manga magazine Monthly Sunday Gene-X from April 2006 to January 2012, with its chapters collected in eleven tankōbon volumes.

An anime television series produced by White Fox was broadcast between April and June 2012. A second season titled Jormungand: Perfect Order aired from October to December 2012.

The manga was licensed for English language release in North America by Viz Media. Both seasons have been licensed by Funimation in North America and Manga Entertainment in the United Kingdom.

Plot

The series follows Koko Hekmatyar, a young arms dealer who sells weapons under HCLI, an international shipping corporation and illegal smuggling operation. As one of the company's unofficial weapon dealers, she sells weapons in a variety of countries while avoiding both local and international authorities. Traveling with her is a team of bodyguards, mostly composed of former soldiers. The newest addition to her crew is Jonah, an inexpressive and deadly child soldier who hates arms dealers.

Media

Manga
Written and illustrated by Keitaro Takahashi, Jormungand was serialized in Shogakukan's seinen manga magazine Monthly Sunday Gene-X from April 19, 2006, to January 19, 2012. Shogakukan compiled its chapters in eleven tankōbon volumes, released from November 17, 2006, to April 19, 2012.

In North America, Viz Media announced the English language release of the manga in February 2009. The eleven volumes were released from November 10, 2009 to April 19, 2012.

Volume list

Anime

An anime television series by White Fox and produced by Geneon was announced on the 10th volume of the manga. The anime began airing on April 10, 2012 on Tokyo MX, Television Kanagawa, TV Aichi and KBS and on later dates on Sun TV, BS11 and AT-X. The show was streamed on Showtime, NicoNico, Bandai Channel and GyaO. A second season of the series, Jormungand: Perfect Order, which began broadcasting on Japanese TV on October 9, 2012. The two seasons aired on Japanese TV at 12:30 AM.

The first release of Jormungand on DVD and Blu-ray was on June 27, 2012 with the first two episodes, "Gun Metal, Calico Road" and "Pulsar" included. Subsequent releases followed with two episodes each on both Blu-rays and DVDs on July 25, August 29 and September 26 of 2012. The Perfect Order DVD/Blu-rays was first released in Japan on December 21, 2012. The DVD and Blu-ray version of the first two seasons of the series was released on February 18, 2014. The anime dub clip showed the dangerous species.

Showgate handles licensing aspect of Jormungand outside Japan. A sneak preview of the anime was held on March 31 to April 1, 2012 at the Anime Contents Expo at the Makuhari Messe in Chiba.

Music
The Jormungand Original Soundtrack was released on June 27, 2012 following the conclusion of the first season. It was composed by Taku Iwasaki and released by the record label Geneon Universal Entertainment.

For the first season, both the opening and ending themes were produced by I've Sound. The opening song is "Borderland" by Mami Kawada, and the ending theme is "Ambivalentidea" by Nagi Yanagi. "Borderland" was released as a single on May 30, 2012, while "Ambivalentidea" was released as a single on June 6, 2012. Both songs were released as singles by Geneon Universal Entertainment.

Additionally, the song "Time To Attack" by American rapper/hip-hop artist SANTA is featured in episodes throughout both seasons of the show, as well as during the next-episode previews at the end of each episode.

Drama CD
A 6-part Drama CD had been released prior to the anime, based on the Orchestra story arc. Of all the voice actors involved in the CD, only Unsho Ishizuka reprised his role as Lehm while the voice actors for everyone else involved in the drama were replaced.

Radio show
A radio show dedicated to Jormungand has been made public with Shizuka Ito and Mutsumi Tamura as the hosts.

Reception
Scott Green, writing for Ain't It Cool News, summed up the series as being enjoyable, but underachieving. Matthew Warner feels that the story in the fourth volume is more focused on the business of trading weapons, describing it as a nice change of pace for the story, but Warner was disappointed that the violence and "dark, twisted plot points" of earlier volumes in the series were not present. Erica Friedman, organiser of Yuricon, noted the yuri potential of Valmet, but declared the manga to be "just a dumb manga that I really like". Karen Maeda enjoyed the action shown in the sixth volume, regarding the panels as being easy to follow, and hoped that Jormungand would be produced as an anime.

Anime News Network's review of Jormungand points out the "challenging ideas about war, peace, and world affairs—and throws in some whiz-bang military action for good measure."

In Japan, the manga's 9th Volume sold 41,712 copies in a week for a total of 42,337 in the 27th place out of 30. Jormungand's 11th Volume was in 10th place and had sold 70,593 copies. It later placed itself in the 20th place out of 30, selling 34,697 copies weekly for a total of 105,290.

Notes

References

External links
Manga
Manga official website at Sunday GX 
Manga official website at Viz Media

Anime
Anime official website 
Anime official website at Funimation

2006 manga
2012 anime television series debuts
Action anime and manga
Anime series based on manga
Funimation
NBCUniversal Entertainment Japan
Seinen manga
Shogakukan manga
Television shows written by Yōsuke Kuroda
Terrorism in fiction
Thriller anime and manga
Viz Media manga
White Fox